Tobi is a given name. It is the given name of:
 Tobi (musician), Nigerian-Canadian rapper
 Tobi Adebayo-Rowling (born 1996), English professional footballer 
 Tobi Adewole (born 1995), English professional footballer
 Tobi Brown, known as TBJZL (born 1993), English YouTuber 
 Tobi Jnohope (born 1997), American soccer player
 Tobi Sokolow (born 1942), American bridge player
 Tobi Stoner (born 1984), Major League Baseball pitcher
 Tobi Vail (born 1969), independent musician

See also
 Toby (disambiguation)
 Tobias (disambiguation)

English-language unisex given names